2004 census may refer to:

2004 Moldovan census
2004 Moroccan census
2004 Transnistrian census